Zoltán Kővágó (born 10 April 1979 in Szolnok) is a Hungarian discus thrower. At the 2004 Olympic Games he initially won the bronze medal, but was promoted to silver when countryfellow Róbert Fazekas was disqualified following a doping rule violation.

He himself was serving a competition ban for "evading doping testing". In August 2011 an Austrian doping controller searched for him in his former address. Kővágó already moved from there – he also officially reported his new address earlier – thus according to the controller's own admission he made an appointment with him on the phone and he stated Kővágó had not wanted to meet with him and had refused to give a sample. On the contrary Kővágó could be able to prove with the call registry that in said period the controller did not make any attempt to search for him. The standpoint of the Hungarian Anti-Doping Committee was that the athlete is innocent and the charge does not hold and together with the Hungarian Olympic Committee and the Hungarian Athletics Association they dispensed the athlete after their investigation. The IAAF did not accept this, thus the Hungarian Athletics Association appealed to the CAS (International Sport Court) and fully supported the athlete arguing all the evidence contradicts the controller's word. In the final sentence the former decision of the IAAF was approved and the athlete was banned. The ban lasted from 11 August 2011 to 5 July 2014.

His personal best throw is 69.95 m, achieved in May 2006 in Salon-de-Provence.

Achievements

Awards
 Masterly youth athlete: 1997
   Cross of Merit of the Republic of Hungary – Golden Cross (2004)
 Hungarian athlete of the Year (1): 2004

References

External links
 
 
 
 
 
 
 

1979 births
Living people
Hungarian male discus throwers
Athletes (track and field) at the 2000 Summer Olympics
Athletes (track and field) at the 2004 Summer Olympics
Athletes (track and field) at the 2008 Summer Olympics
Athletes (track and field) at the 2016 Summer Olympics
Olympic silver medalists for Hungary
Olympic athletes of Hungary
European Athletics Championships medalists
Medalists at the 2004 Summer Olympics
Doping cases in athletics
Hungarian sportspeople in doping cases
World Athletics Championships athletes for Hungary
Olympic silver medalists in athletics (track and field)
People from Szolnok
Sportspeople from Jász-Nagykun-Szolnok County
20th-century Hungarian people